Chestnut Grove is an unincorporated community within Shelby County, Kentucky, United States. It was also known as Gleneyrie. Their post office  has been closed.

References

Unincorporated communities in Shelby County, Kentucky
Unincorporated communities in Kentucky